The Nonnenbach is a small river of Mecklenburg-Vorpommern, Germany. It flows through the Wanzkaer See and it discharges into the Tollensesee, which is passed by the Tollense, near Groß Nemerow. Upstream of the Wanzkaer See, the Nonnnebach traditionally is called Werbender Mühlenbachor Werbender Mühlbach.

See also
List of rivers of Mecklenburg-Vorpommern

Rivers of Mecklenburg-Western Pomerania
Nature reserves in Mecklenburg-Western Pomerania
Rivers of Germany